Patriarch Callinicus of Constantinople may refer to:

 Callinicus I of Constantinople, Ecumenical Patriarch in 693–705
 Callinicus II of Constantinople, Ecumenical Patriarch in 1688, 1689–1693 and 1694–1702
 Callinicus III of Constantinople, Ecumenical Patriarch in 1726
 Callinicus IV of Constantinople, Ecumenical Patriarch in 1757